Voloshka is a rural locality (a settlement) in Konoshsky District, Arkhangelsk Oblast, Russia. The population was 902 as of 2010. There are 29 streets.

Geography 
Voloshka is located on the Voloshka River, 67 km north of Konosha (the district's administrative centre) by road.

References 

Rural localities in Konoshsky District